A Note in Music is Rosamond Lehmann's second novel. The novel was published to less acclaim than Lehmann's first novel, Dusty Answer. The novel is semi-autobiographical, as it is based on the marriage between Lehmann and Wogan Phillips, a painter.

References

English novels
1930 British novels
Novels about artists
Chatto & Windus books
Henry Holt and Company books